The 1949 San Remo Grand Prix was a Grand Prix motor race held at San Remo on 3 April 1949. The race, held over two heats, was won by Juan Manuel Fangio.

Entries

Classification

First heat

Second heat

Aggregate

References

San Remo Grand Prix
San Remo Grand Prix
San Remo Grand Prix